Piano Works may refer to:

Music

Compositions
"Piano Works", a composition by Ed Starink, part of Starink's Universe Symphony
Piano Works, published edition name of many printed editions of sheet music, particularly:
Piano Works''' Johann Nepomuk Hummel

Albums
Own compositionsPiano Works, album by Igor Khoroshev 1999Piano Works, album by Denver Oldham 1992
Piano Works (Craig Armstrong album)The Piano Works, album by Conrad Schnitzler 1997Around Brazil, by Simon Nabatov, 2005, also known as Piano Works V: Around BrazilClassical pianistsThe Piano Works, album by Fujiko Hemming 2009Piano Works'', series of albums recorded by Margaret Fingerhut

See also
Piano works (Bruckner)